Khafr (also known as Khafār) is a village in Padena-ye Vosta Rural District, Padena District, Semirom County, Isfahan Province, Iran. At the 2006 census, its population was 1,396, in 406 families.

References

External links

Populated places in Semirom County